Historic Seaside Village Co-operative encompasses a primarily residential area in the South End of Bridgeport, Connecticut. It is bounded on the east by Iranistan Avenue, the north by South Avenue, the south by Forest Court and by the west by Alsace Street.  The property consists of a densely built collection of brick rowhouses, arranged in irregular combinations. The village was developed during World War I to alleviate a housing shortage caused by an influx of workers hired to work in the city's munitions factories. It is a good example of an early government-funded project of this type, and was a collaborative design effort by R. Clipston Sturgis, Skinner & Walker, and Arthur Shurtleff. 
The district was listed on the National Register of Historic Places in 1990.

Overview 

Seaside Village was built by the federal government in response to the housing problem for factory workers in World War I.  Bridgeport manufacturers had expanded their factories, but were unable to maximize production due to a lack of adequate housing for workers.

At first, Bridgeport manufacturers attempted to take on the housing issue themselves.  They wanted to attract workers to Bridgeport, not just for the short-term war needs, but for the future of the city, and therefore chose to build quality housing.  They chose to set a high standard for housing by creating the most desirable model of American working class housing.   They hired the best architect and the best town planner in the country -  Mr. R. Clipston Sturgis of Boston, as the architect, and Mr. Andrew Shurleff of Boston, as the town planner.    The local housing authority built some housing initially in the Lordship section of Stratford and in the Grasmere section of Fairfield, but could not build housing fast enough to meet the needs of the war effort.

The federal government stepped in to help Bridgeport and other cities across the country.   Congress authorized and funded the United States Housing Corporation (USHC)  in July 1918 with $100 million in capital.  The Director of USHC's town planning division was Frederick Law Olmsted Jr., whose father designed Central Park and Seaside Park.

The USHC chose a number of locations in Bridgeport to build worker housing, but the largest lot was the one owned by The Crane Corporation.  It became known as the Crane Lot or the Crane Development until shortly before it was completed, when it was renamed Seaside Village.  Its location within walking distance of many factories and its proximity to Seaside Park made it desirable.

Seaside Village was built in approximately 90 days, starting in late October 1918 and ending in early March 1919.  377 homes were planned, but only 257 were built due to the end of the war shortly after construction began.

Seaside Village began as rentals for factory workers and their families, but became owner-occupied by 1955, when 90% of the tenants agreed to become part of cooperative housing.   Whereas most federally funded housing projects have come and gone, including Marina Village, across the street which was built in the 1940s for WWII factory workers, Seaside Village remains a successful model for a high-density urban community to this day.
     
Seaside Village is on the National Register of Historic Places due to its architecture, community planning, and social history.   It became one of the first collaborations of city planners, architects, and landscape designers in creating a comprehensive approach to community planning.    It is cited in architectural textbooks and is of great interest to architectural historians due to the precedents it set for later development, its aesthetics, its sustainability, and desirability as a place to live.

Early history of Seaside Village 

Bridgeport experienced a big influx of immigrants and industrial workers in the late 1800s and early 1900s as the city became the major industrial center in Connecticut. Bridgeport's population increased more than threefold from 1880 to 1914, growing from 30,000 to 115,000 as immigrant labor arrived and manufacturing expanded.   World War I brought large munitions orders from the English, French, and Russian armies.  Other companies manufactured war-related products, which contributed to the population expansion. 
 
From 1914 to 1916, the population grew from 115,000 to 175,000 as Bridgeport factories supplied European countries and the U.S. with war-related products.  By 1918, Bridgeport had over $60 million in work contracts for the federal government for the war effort.   Remington Arms alone produced 50 percent of the U.S. Army's small-arms cartridges and employed 17,000 laborers.

The manufacturers had expanded their factories, however they were unable to meet production quotas due to a severe lack of adequate housing for the workers.  The housing shortage was so severe that workers were buying train tickets and sleeping in the railway terminal, renting eight hour shifts in rooming houses to sleep, and the City even considered building massive tents for housing up to 10 families.

In addition to the housing shortage, the facilities that housed the workers and their families were inadequate.  Tenements, the primary housing for factory workers and their families were dark, often windowless, with a central shaft for ventilation.  They were also unsanitary, ugly, flammable, and miserable to live in.  The cost of real estate had soared, so buying a home was out of reach of the working class.  There was an urgent need for quality rentals to attract and retain workers in the factories.

The Bridgeport Housing Company was formed in 1916 to deal with this housing problem.  It was composed of about a dozen manufacturers and public service companies with capital of $1,000,000.  One of its first actions was to appoint R. Clipston Sturgis of Boston, as the architect and Andrew Shurtleff as the town planner.  The town planner controlled most aspects of the project. Mr. W. H. Ham, a Boston engineer, was appointed as the general manager.

R. Clipston Sturges was the top ranked architect of his time.  He served as President of the American Institute of Architects from 1913- 1915.  He was involved in designing the wings for BuIfinch's state house in Boston. Sturgis also designed the Perkins Institute for the Blind in Watertown, Massachusetts.

Arthur Shurtleff studied under Charles Eliot from 1895 to 1896 at Harvard and worked for Olmsted Brothers Landscape Architects from 1896 through 1905, before he opened his own firm in Boston. Along with Frederick Law Olmsted, Jr., he was an early faculty member of Harvard University's landscape architecture program, founded in 1900.

William H. Ham graduated from Dartmouth College in 1897 and in 1898 from the Thayer School (Dartmouth) of Civil Engineering and Architecture. From 1908 to 1916 Mr. Ham was a member of the firm of French and Hubbard, consulting engineers on factory buildings.  He then became manager of the Bridgeport Housing Company.  Ham aggressively lobbied Washington D.C. for $3 million in loans to cover the costs of construction for WWI housing in Bridgeport.  The loan had just been approved by Congress, when the federal government decided to directly address the problem since similar problems were occurring in other cities across the United States.  The U.S. Housing Corporation asked the Bridgeport Housing group to act as their local agents and gave them the task of selecting the architects, directing the design, and securing the builders.

To solve the housing crisis for workers serving the war effort, the United States Housing Corporation was formed in July 1918 with $100 million in capital.  They partnered with the Bridgeport Housing Company and examined 20 housing sites in Bridgeport deciding upon 7 of them (two of which, were abandoned on the signing of the armistice).  These sites were located to bring the greatest number of workers within walking distance of their work.  They were also designed to serve as models for safe and attractive housing compared to the tenement buildings.  This is one reason they were made of brick instead of wood.  They were also designed for better ventilation and light than the tenement buildings.   The costs were kept down by the small size of the units and the use of only a few building designs.
  
The first of the United States Housing Corporation projects to be completed was Black Rock Gardens, followed by the Wilmot Apartments, both designed by Sturgis with Skinner and Walker as associate architects. Seaside Village, the third to be finished, was designed by Sturgis with Andrew H. Hepburn as associate architect.

At this time Seaside Village was known as the “Crane Tract.”  The units were designed for regular workers, who would normally live in low grade tenements.  The houses were planned for “the needs and salary of the man who will never be able to earn more than an ordinary wage.  The comfort of his family and conditions which will provide them with a chance to live under good conditions and sanitary surroundings have been carefully studied, and it is thought that the government will favor the plan of selling the houses to tenants if they so desire.” 
 
The Crane site was chosen because it was within walking distance of the West End shops and would enable most workers to come home for lunch.  It was adjacent to the Crane Company plant and had been part of the Crane Company property until the federal government purchased the land.  It was renamed as “Seaside Village” prior to completion.  Proximity to Seaside Park was another reason.  At one time it was a marshland and had a creek running through it, but by the time it was chosen for development in 1918, the wetlands had been filled in by industrial waste.
  
Only two sides of the site had existing streets as boundaries, South Avenue and Iranistan Avenue. Iranistan was an asphalt-paved main thoroughfare leading northwest to the street car line, stores, and other factories. To the southeast, Iranistan Avenue led to Seaside Park on Long Island Sound. Across the street on Iranistan there was a mix of middle and lower-income housing, including three-story tenement buildings. There was also a steam freight track leading to the main railroad tracks and various storage yards and facilities on the Crane Tract. The railroad track came in handy later when the bricks were being transported for construction.
  
Seaside Village homes were built to be enduring and aesthetically pleasing, which is why they were constructed of brick with slate roofs. They were designed to have a distinctively New England character. Each family would have its own backyard and the village was designed with courtyards and a village square, which could contain plantings and gardens.

Due to Olmstead's influence at the federal level, Seaside Village was one of the first complexes to be built in the “English Garden City” concept of planning small communities to provide much green space for sunlight, fresh air, and gardens, which is also called the [Garden City Movement]. Architectural groupings alternated with open parks. Seaside Village remains to this day, one of the six most important examples of the “English Garden City” model in the United States.
  
Andrew H. Hepburn of the Boston firm of Hepburn & Parker was brought on as associate architect just for the Crane Development. The need for an additional architect was due to the Crane Development being the largest of the developments to be built by the USHC in Bridgeport and it was also considered to the most important one.
  
The land was extremely flat, but the developers created an interesting arrangement using curved streets and placing units in varying combinations. Delays in approvals enabled the architects and planners time to create scale models of the entire development and experiment in placing them in different ways. They were able to view the three-dimensional models from every angle to study their relationships to one another. The basis of the model was irregularity which was achieved by varying the placement of the limited number of floor plans. They also built around some of the existing trees on the property, which created variety.  The curvilinear streets followed precedents in European towns and England, rather than the American gridiron pattern.
 
The units were designed primarily as row houses since this allowed for the most density.  The longer the row, the more economical the construction, but there was an issue with getting behind the homes for garbage and ash disposal.  They solved this problem by installing sunken garbage receptacles in front eliminating the need for rear access to the units.

The interiors consisted of a few floor plans of three, four, and five rooms.  They were designed to suit the needs of small families in a straightforward, comfortable way.  A combined kitchen/dining area/living room was used in the design.  No furnaces were installed.  The heating was done by the kitchen stove sometimes supplemented by a stove in another room.  However, the homes were designed so that the occupants could install a furnace if they desired.  Coal and gas were the main sources of heating at that time, oil heat did not come along until later.

The homes and streets were laid out to preserve as many trees as possible.  This accounts for the varying setbacks for homes from the street and some of the curves in the roads.  For example, Forest Court was diverted to save a group of trees at the corner.  Every street was planted with a specific American tree: Forest Street and Forest Court : White oak (Quercus Alba); Burnham Street & Flanders Street : Basswood or American linden (Tilia Americana); Cole St : Sweetgum (Liquidambar Styraciflua); Sims Street: Sugar maple (Acer Saccharum); and Alsace Street: American Elm (Ulmus Americana).  There were probably American ash trees (Fraxinus Americana) on Iranistan Avenue, but there's only one left.  Many of the original trees have succumbed to emerald ash borer and Dutch elm disease or heavy traffic for the sugar maples.  Salt in the ground after the hurricane floods in 2011 and 2012 took out most of the basswood and sweetgum trees.

Each home had its own entrance with backyard space.  Chicken wire fences separated the backyards.  Heating was from a coal stove in the kitchen.  There was no central heating, but a single register furnace could be installed in the basement at the renter's expense, if desired.  The units had electric lights and modern plumbing. The pantry was designed to hold an ice box that could be drained onto the ground underneath.
  
Work on the excavations of the basements began in September 1918 for the first 100 homes.  By the time the final plans were submitted by the end of September, 380 homes had been planned for the Crane tract.  “A central playground is a feature of these plans.”   The buildings were to be made of brick even though this would mean that every brickyard in Connecticut was required to dedicate their output solely to this project.  60-90 railroad carloads a day arrived at the site. The actual construction took 90 days from start to finish.
  
Seaside Village consisted of 24.72 acres from South Avenue to Atlantic Street.  The plan was to build: 6 semi-detached houses, 259 row houses, 28 semi-detached two-flat houses, 84 row two-flat houses for a total of 377 houses.  Only 257 of the 377 homes were built.  The remaining homes were scheduled to be built in the area where the field and parking lot are now located.  What was finally built consisted of: 6 semi-detached houses, 185 row houses, 12 semi-detached two-flat houses, 54 row two-flat houses for a total of 257 houses.  There were a total of 52 buildings erected.  
The site was almost level and “just enough above high tide water to clear itself of storm water when properly graded and provided with storm sewers.” It had a few groups of trees, which were incorporated into the plan.
  
By October, it was being referred to as the Crane Lot Housing Development.  Groundbreaking was expected the week of October 21, 1918.  Just three weeks later, the truce for WWI was signed on November 11, 1918.  This was a problem for the Crane Development as it was only one-half of one percent complete as of November 6, 1918. By December, the City was wavering over whether to complete the housing.  Work continued, however, by March 1919, the Housing Company began to lay off workers.  At this point, the newspapers began referring to the Crane Development as Seaside Village.  The units rented for $15/month at a time when munitions workers were getting paid $75/week, while the average pay for a worker was $10/week.
During this same month (March 1919) H. K. Moses of the Architectural Department of the U.S. Housing Corporation and Frederick Law Olmstead, Jr., Chief of the Town Planning Department visited Bridgeport.  While touring Seaside Village, Mr. Moses said, “It looks like a bit of England.”  Moses was a key leader in the revival of Colonial architecture in the United States.
 
By September 1919, the construction of Seaside Village had cost $1,971,839.  Ninety-two of the units were still vacant as the war had ended and the demand for workers had abated.  The Senate charged the U.S. Housing Corporation with inefficiencies and improperly spent federal money.  The report stated that “A failure to promptly cease building operations on the signing of the armistice proved either a desire to complete their town beautiful experiments or to be helpful, at government expense, to the local communities involved.”

Seaside Village 1920–1950 

 January 1920, the U.S. Housing Corporation sold Black Rock Apartments (216 units) and Crane Development (257 units) to the Bridgeport Housing Company as well as a few other properties for $1.3 million.  On December 10, 1920, the Eighth National Conference on Housing in America arranged for an Automobile Tour of points of interest in Bridgeport and included Seaside Village.  It is in this pamphlet that reference is made to a creek and cove that had previously existed on the land.  “Burnham Street was originally a creek used by the sportsmen of Bridgeport as a storage place for boats in which they went out on the meadows to shoot water fowls.  Albert Square was formerly a cove in this inlet and was laid out so as to avoid bad foundation and furnish a breathing space in the village.  The site of this village for years as a dump used by the City and by the Crane Company for their foundry material and shows the possibility of reclaiming land for housing purposes.” 
 
On December 20, 1922, The Bridgeport Times, wrote an article about how attractive the Seaside Village homes are and that there was a model home open to the public at the corner of Burnham and Iranistan.  It mentions that there are kitchen cabinets and ranges that come with the units, which was not typical at that time.  The house was heated by a one pipe furnace.  It did not state the fuel type, which was likely coal, given the time period.
The Bridgeport Housing Company was renting units for $22 to $24 per month for the 3 room units and $26 to $28.50 per month for the 4 room units.

By 1934, Seaside Village had endured the Great Depression.  It still consisted of just rental units at this time, but there had not been a vacancy in five years.  It was believed the desirability was due to its proximity to Seaside Park, the “excellent neighborhood”, atmosphere of trees and shrubbery, as well as the brick buildings with slate roofs.

Seaside Village 1950–present 

Bridgeport Housing sold Seaside Village along with four other developments to the Farm Bureau Insurance Group in February 1954.   In September 1954, tenants accepted a cooperative ownership plan which was offered to them by the Farm Bureau.   This was the first privately owned housing co-operative in Connecticut.  Each of the five developments (Seaside Village, Bridgeport Park Apartments, Bridgeport Garden Apartments, Bridgeport Wilmot Apartments, and Bridgeport Gateway Apartments) had their own President and Board of Directors elected by their leaseholders.  The average sales price was $3,280.  Terms were 20% down with the balance paid over 20 years at five percent interest.    The average monthly payment was $18 for the mortgage and $22 for the common charges.  In October 1954, Seaside Village installed gas furnaces in the basements of nearly all of the units.  The common charges went up $5 per month for the units that converted to gas heat.

In 1957 a unit came on the market for $4,200.  The common charges were $45 per month.  In the 1960s units were listed between $3,100 to $8,000.  Common charges were $35 to $46 per month.  In the 1970s units were listed between $8,500 to $15,500.  Common charges were between $35 to $64 per month.
In 1973 a certificate of beautification was given to Seaside Village based on the “continued cleanliness and beauty that has prevailed in these homes.  It is a great source of pride to Bridgeport to have, in its midst, a group of citizens who maintain such standards year in and year out.” 

In 1975, there was an article in the newspaper about families in Seaside Village burning their 20-year mortgages, which were obtained when the co-op was formed in 1954.  Villagers celebrated with a day-long picnic at the Village's Little League field.  
On September 26, 1990, Seaside Village was officially listed on the National Register of Historic Places as the “Seaside Village Historic District.”  It was stated that “alterations to this complex are slight” and goes on to cite the oriel windows, 6/6 windows topped by brick arches, wood shutters, various classically inspired door surrounds, with a predominant theme of Tuscan Doric.  “While the steep pitches of the roofs represent an attempt to adapt an early eighteenth-century southern form to a northern climate, the careful massing of the buildings, their Colonial Revival design vocabulary, and studied placement along picturesque, tree-lined streets all consciously recall Old New England villages, where outbuildings and extensions have been added over time to the original house.”  They also stated that it “survives with surprising architectural integrity as the last of four U.S. Housing Corporation projects in Bridgeport.”

Resiliency 

Over the course of years, changes in lifestyle, population, physical wear and tear, and inconsistent architectural and aesthetic standards began to warrant attention.  The charming narrow tree-lined streets that were designed in 1918 for an occasional car were now struggling to accommodate multiple vehicle families. A variety of storm doors and front door overhangs, added in the 1950s for protection from rain and snow, were not in keeping with the Georgian architectural style. The same was becoming true for replacement windows and other architectural elements. A significant number of the original mature trees were aging out and needing to be replaced. However, one of the biggest concerns was the need for storm water management throughout the Village.
 
The effects of chronic flooding after significant rain events were causing street and parking lot flooding, soil erosion, occasional basement flooding, and some thought perhaps even some foundation settlement. The concern about the long-term effect of the structure of the buildings, the need to set some architectural standards, and to prioritize the wishes of the community, prompted the formation of the Historic Preservation Committee in 2009.
Soon thereafter, the Committee approached the Yale School of Architecture's Urban Design Workshop  (YUDW) to discuss a possible collaboration for the development of a Master Plan. The Plan would provide the community with direction on the inter-related issues of preservation, design guidelines, storm water management, landscape and streetscape, and traffic and parking, as well as looking at options for future development. The Board of Directors approved their proposal and the Committee then submitted it to the Fairfield County Community Foundation for funding. Seaside Village was awarded $24,000 in October 2010 to begin work on its Master Plan.
  
The Yale team consisted of Alan Plattus, YUDW Director, Andrei Harwell, YUDW Project Coordinator, and Alex Felson, Landscape Architect. The other partners on this project were the City of Bridgeport, the Regional Plan Association and the Seaside Village community.  Two years of works ensued, including surveys and meetings with community members and various city officials to gather data. In addition to the contracted Master Plan, the installation of the rain garden was added to the project.  The rain garden provided the solution to end flooding on the far parking lot.

The Seaside Village Master Plan delivered what it promised in terms of direction on preservation, design guidelines, storm water management, landscape and streetscape, and traffic and parking, as well as options for future development.  The Seaside Village Sustainable Master Plan consists of a 77-page document published by the Yale Urban Design Workshop and Urban Ecology and Design Lab on December 12, 2011.

The Master Plan also played a role in the Rebuild by Design project, which had been created in response to the devastation in the northeastern United States caused by Superstorm Sandy.  The U.S. Department of Housing and Urban Development and the Presidential Hurricane Sandy Rebuilding Task Force initiated the Rebuild by Design Competition (RBD). The competition created innovative community and policy-based proposals to protect coastal communities most at risk due to increasingly severe weather events and future uncertainties.  During the final phase of the competition, the team focused on Bridgeport to integrate urban development with natural systems, so that Bridgeport could become a model for other cities along the Long Island Sound and throughout New England.
 
   Seaside Village's Master Plan gave Bridgeport's proposal a credible research and data-based document that addressed the kind of sustainability issues that the Rebuild by Design team would focus on for the city.  Yale's prior involvement with Seaside Village's Master Plan and the knowledge base that they acquired from this project enabled them to link their research to the larger scale issues facing Bridgeport that this national competition was addressing and helped to secure funding for Bridgeport.
  
The city was awarded $10 million for planning, design, and construction via the federal government's Rebuild by Design competition.  Arcadis, which had been advising Bridgeport on resilience since 2014, helped the city secure another $41 million in funding through HUD's National Disaster Resilience competition for 2015-16.  Construction should begin in the Spring of 2019 and be completed in the Fall of 2022.  Projects include a $6.5 million storm-water system and a 2.5-acre storm-water park to manage water runoff along Iranistan.
 
Alan Plattus, Director of the Yale Urban Design Workshop, from the Seaside Village Sustainable Master Plan, got involved in the Rebuild by Design and Resilient Bridgeport projects.  Seaside Village became part of the study area, but the final project included the Marina Village area, not the village itself due to budget constraints.

In addition to its role in securing funding to prevent flooding in the South End, the Master Plan was the inspiration for Seaside Village's Rain Garden Project.  A major focus of the master plan was on the use of green infrastructure to manage stormwater runoff and reduce neighborhood flooding.  The Urban Ecology Lab at Yale University came up with possible sites for experimental rain gardens to deal with the extra water in a more natural way, allowing it to be slowly absorbed into the ground after flooding.
  
A corner of the field near the end of the parking lot was selected as the ideal site because of the seasonal flooding of the field all the way to Atlantic Street and adjacent parking lot.  University of Connecticut students built the rain garden, the city of Bridgeport donated materials, machinery and many plants after construction.
  
The rain garden area consists of six experimental rain gardens, approximately 8’ x 22’, which receive runoff from the community parking lot via a series of pipes. A few feet below the ground surface, an impermeable clay layer confines underlying groundwater—but in each rain garden, a permeable sand wick perforates the clay.  The initial (2011, 2012) wetland plant community failed due to inundation with storm surge from Long Island Sound, brought by Hurricane Sandy in 2012. The most recent replanting event (in 2013) used only salt-tolerant native New England marsh species.

The Nature Conservancy and Groundworks Bridgeport have an annual commitment to maintaining the gardens in partnership with Seaside Village.  The day-to-day maintenance and plantings have been handled by a resident volunteer, Diego Celis.
  
Seaside Village endured two catastrophic floods within a 14-month period with Irene in 2011 and Sandy in 2012.  Hurricane Irene's 3-foot storm surge left behind more than $600,000 in damages.  Sandy's 9-foot storm surge was worse than Irene, destroying mechanicals in basements that had been replaced a year before after Irene and reaching units that had not been affected by Irene.  Approximately 140 units benefited from the installation of new electrical panels raised to the first level, sump pumps and other work to help make their units more resilient in future storms thanks to grants from the Robin Hood Relief Fund, United Way, and other funders.

Many of the plantings in the Village and some trees were destroyed by the salt water floods.  Villagers have replanted many flowers and shrubs.  The Seaside Village Tree Committee worked with Bridgeport's tree warden on stump removal and have replaced 39 trees since the storms.  A walk through the village in the spring or summer shows the pride that villagers take in their yards and common areas.

Seaside Village's attention to their gardens has become known to some in the botanical community.  Seaside Village even has a rose named after it in the New York Botanical Gardens.   A Seaside Village resident, Diego Celis, found a double mutation of a wild beach rose near the village.  He brought a few of the cuttings to the New York Botanical Garden, where the curator of the Peggy Rockefeller rose garden, Stephen Scaniello, named it “Seaside Joy” after Seaside Village.  Seaside Joy looks like an old rose, with cupped flowers and an intense fragrance.

In 2014, the Seaside Village Garden Committee decided to build a community garden with raised beds for vegetable production as well as a fenced-in dog run.  Village residents took on the task of building the raised beds.  The first season 15 were built.  They have since expanded to 50.  There will be a maximum of 64 beds when completed.  An arbor with a picnic table next to the gardens has created a relaxing location for village potlucks and impromptu picnics.  
The following quote from Yale's Master Plan captures the essence of Seaside Village's first 100 years succinctly:
 
Seaside Village is a jewel in the crown of a proud old industrial city.  Not only is it a survivor from a crucial period in the urban and industrial history of Bridgeport, it is a significant and widely known landmark in the history of American housing and community design.  While much of the economic, institutional and architectural fabric of the era it represents has lost its purpose and declined or disappeared, Seaside Village is a thriving community whose population has transitioned from factory workers to a diverse group of mixed-income residents, devoted to both the heritage and the current life of the Village.

References

Historic districts on the National Register of Historic Places in Connecticut
National Register of Historic Places in Fairfield County, Connecticut
Colonial Revival architecture in Connecticut
Bridgeport, Connecticut
Historic districts in Connecticut